He Yi (born 17 December 1982) is a Chinese rower. He competed in the men's eight event at the 2008 Summer Olympics.

References

1982 births
Living people
Chinese male rowers
Olympic rowers of China
Rowers at the 2008 Summer Olympics
Rowers from Shanghai
Rowers at the 2006 Asian Games
Asian Games competitors for China